Kranti Prakash Jha (born 2 November 1988) is an Indian Bollywood actor, film producer, television personality, businessman and model from Begusarai, Bihar, best known for his roles of Santosh Lal in the 2016 Indian biographical sports film M.S. Dhoni: The Untold Story.

He studied at Hindu College, University of Delhi. He has done his schooling from Purnia, Bihar. His father was a bureaucrat and was posted as RDDE at Purnia.
He began his career by appearing in ads. He has featured in numerous TV commercials and music videos. He debuted in the lead role in the award-winning Maithili film Mithila Makhaan, and in the Bhojpuri films Deswa and Once Upon a Time in Bihar in lead roles.

His recent portrayal of a young migrant Bihari in the viral Chhath video with Kristine Zedek, sung by Sharda Sinha and Directed By National Awarded Nitin Neera Chandra and produced by Neetu Chandra has brought many laurels and appraisals from fans. He will be next seen in the Discovery Jeet's Biopic on Indian Hockey Coach Harinder Singh.

He recently played the lead role in the web series Raktanchal released on MX Player.

Filmography

Films

Television

Web series

References

Indian male film actors
People from Darbhanga district
Living people
1988 births
Hindu College, Delhi alumni